Robert Taylor (1792-1850) was an English man transported to New South Wales, who became an early Australian businessman.

Taylor was originally from Wigan, England. In 1819, he was convicted of larceny and sentenced to transportation to New South Wales for seven years. He was released in 1826, and subsequently became a businessman and landowner in Sydney. Located on Robert Taylor's land, and named after him, is Taylor Square.

1792 births
1850 deaths
Convicts transported to Australia
19th-century Australian businesspeople